The 2009 ABC Supply Company A.J. Foyt 225 was the fifth round of the 2009 IndyCar Series season, held on May 31, 2009, at the  Milwaukee Mile, in West Allis, Wisconsin.

Qualifying results 

Note: Briscoe and Rahal broke the previous four-lap qualifying record set last year by Marco Andretti at 1:26.9591 sec (168.079 mph).
Best lap shown in bold.

Race

Standings after the race 
Drivers' Championship standings

 Note: Only the top five positions are included for the standings.

References

ABC Supply Company A.J. Foyt 225
Milwaukee Indy 225
ABC Supply Company A.J. Foyt 225
ABC Supply Company A.J. Foyt 225